Aseana City (also known as Aseana Business Park) is a  mixed-use central business district development located in Parañaque, Metro Manila, Philippines. Owned and developed by D.M. Wenceslao & Associates (DMWAI) through Aseana Holdings, it is situated in the centermost portion of the Central Business Park (alongside PAGCOR's Entertainment City) between the SM business complex in the north and Asiaworld in the south within the Bay City area.

Development
DMWAI was awarded by the Philippine Reclamation Authority to occupy the CBP I-B and C lots as the Aseana Business Park. The project began in 2008.

The development occupies  Neo-Chinatown, Aseana 1-3 Office Buildings, Singapore School Manila, The King's School, Manila, Ayala Malls Manila Bay, and the Passport Center of the Department of Foreign Affairs. City of Dreams Manila, one of Entertainment City's integrated resort and casinos, is also situated.

Other places located in Aseana City are the Aseana Power Station, Aseana Square, and the St. John Paul II Chapel.

Controversy
In June 2013, Alphaland owner Roberto Ongpin got a court order from the Makati Regional Trial Court to deliver the  marina project with Aseana, despite he refused to pay his dues. DMWAI, however, refused to sign the loan documents related to mortgage, which led to its cancellation of their joint-venture with Alphaland.

Events
On April 9, 2016, Rapper Kanye West headlined the Paradise International Music Festival (alongside Rudimental, Afrojack and Austin Mahone) at the Aseana Concert Grounds.

References

Buildings and structures under construction in Metro Manila
Mixed-use developments in Metro Manila
Planned communities in the Philippines
Redeveloped ports and waterfronts in the Philippines
Manila Bay
Buildings and structures in Parañaque